Charles Keith Quentin Jackman (4 February 1906 – 23 February 1988) was a cricketer who played first-class cricket for Canterbury and Auckland between 1935 and 1942 and represented New Zealand in 1935–36.

A wicket-keeper, Jackman made his first-class debut for South Island against North Island in 1934–35, making one catch and four stumpings. The next season, playing in the Plunket Shield for Canterbury against Wellington, he set a New Zealand record when he made seven stumpings in the match, six of them off the leg-spin of Bill Merritt. The record still stands. Later in 1935-36 he was selected for two of the four matches New Zealand played against the touring MCC.

Jackman married Cecil Vivian Addison McConnell in Auckland in September 1937.

See also
 List of Auckland representative cricketers

References

External links
 
Charlie Jackman at CricketArchive

1906 births
1988 deaths
New Zealand cricketers
Canterbury cricketers
Auckland cricketers
South Island cricketers
Wicket-keepers